O Holy Night is a Christmas carol composed by Adolphe Adam in 1847.

O Holy Night may also refer to:
O Holy Night, a 1976 album by Luciano Pavarotti
O Holy Night (John Berry album), 1995
O' Holy Night (Daniel O'Donnell album), 2010
O Holy Night (Jackie Evancho EP), 2010